The 2000 Vuelta a Asturias was the 44th edition of the Vuelta a Asturias road cycling stage race, which was held from 9 May to 14 May 2000. The race started and finished in Oviedo. The race was won by Joseba Beloki of the  team.

General classification

References

Vuelta Asturias
2000 in road cycling
2000 in Spanish sport